West Cork is a non-fiction podcast series reported and hosted by Sam Bungey and Jennifer Forde, about the murder of Sophie Toscan du Plantier in Drinane, County Cork on 23 December 1996. The 13-episode series premiered as an Audible original on 8 February 2018, as a binge, and was made freely available widely as a podcast in 2021. A new episode of the series was released on 14 May 2021, detailing the trial in absentia of the main suspect. 
 
The series investigates the murder of Sophie Toscan du Plantier née Bouniol (28 July 1957 – 23 December 1996), a French television producer who was beaten to death outside her holiday home near Toormore, Schull, County Cork, Ireland, on the night of 23 December 1996.

The podcast series was critically acclaimed upon release. It is Audible's most listened-to podcast series of all time, and spent seven consecutive weeks as the site's number one nonfiction best seller. The series became notable again in April 2021 when it was released free to air on the general podcast platforms and went in at number one In the Apple podcast charts in several countries.

The story
Sophie Toscan du Plantier was found murdered on 23 December 1996, on the driveway of her holiday home in Drinane, near Schull, County Cork, Ireland. Sophie was born on 28 July 1957 and raised in the first district of Paris in an apartment where her parents Marguerite and Georges Bouniol still live. She married in 1980 and had a son, Pierre-Louis Bauday-Vignaud, the following year. Sophie was a producer of  documentaries for French television, on subjects around art and various subcultures. In 1991 she remarried to the renowned French film producer Daniel Toscan du Plantier. They lived in the second district of Paris and in 1992 Sophie bought a getaway home in Toormore, County Cork. Sophie visited frequently with friends and family but in December 1996 she travelled there alone for the first time.

Among her documentary projects is a film about the concept of the fold in art and philosophy, titled ‘Il Voit Des Plis Partout’ (He Sees Folds Everywhere). Directed by Guy Girard the film was released a year after her murder and was billed as presented by ‘Sophie Toscan Du Plantier"

TV adaptation  
On 13 May 2021, Sister Pictures, the company behind the Chernobyl miniseries announced that it was in development with a dramatic adaptation of the West Cork series.

Critical reception  
The series has been widely praised with documentary maker Louis Theroux describing the series as "possibly the best true crime podcast of all time". Nicholas Quah at Vulture described it as "vastly more soulful than its true crime peers" and "a stellar true crime tale". Justine McCarthy in The Sunday Times described it as a "seminal series" and "a work of forensic journalism stamped with integrity". Una Mullaly in The Irish Times called it "the next Serial". Writing in  The Times, India Knight said "West Cork is the new Serial. It may even be better"  The Telegraph described the series as "Brilliantly reported and compellingly constructed". New York Magazine  and Time magazine voted West Cork one of the podcasts of 2018 and Time said "The hosts beautifully communicate how a tragedy can impact a town and its people in devastating ways". Esquire called it "a bit of a phenomenon". Writing in Wired, Virginia Heffernan called it "engrossing". The Guardian called West Cork a "nuanced, insightful examination", wrote that the series is "important because of the way it handles the tragedy", and declared "it has everything you need for a top notch investigative series".

Local reception 
Leading regional newspaper The Southern Star introduced a weekly column devoted to the series noting that "The amount of future projects the West Cork podcast has either inspired or influenced is truly mind boggling." The columnist is effusive in their praise for the series, writing at one point: "we’re only three minutes into episode two of 13 and I’ve never felt more alive."

The paper has described the series as "phenomenally successful", as well as "thoughtful and compelling a "huge hit", and a "global smash".

The paper reported that news of a dramatic adaptation of the series by Sister was "bound to create a lot of local interest, given the huge popularity of the original audio podcast."

New episode 
On 14 May 2021, West Cork creators released a new episode of the series, detailing the trial and conviction in-absentia of Ian Bailey. The episode made news  for uncovering forensic results that had not been made public showing that unknown male DNA was found on an exhibit taken from the crime scene.

People involved
 
Sophie Toscan du Plantier: Murder victim. 39-year-old French documentary producer.

Ian Bailey: English-born freelance journalist and principal suspect in murder. 
 
Jules Thomas: Bailey's longtime partner, Jules is mother of three girls, none by Bailey.  
 
Marie Farrell: Key witness who claimed she saw Ian Bailey near the crime scene on the night of the murder. Several years later, she recanted this testimony claiming she had been coached by gardai.
 
Martin Graham police informant but double crossed the police, telling Bailey of their plan to elicit a confession 
  
Pierre-Louis Bauday-Vignaud: Sophie's son from a previous marriage, who was 14 at the time of his mother's murder
 
Marie Dosé: Lead prosecuting lawyer in the 2019 trial in absentia of Ian Bailey in Paris.
 
Alain Spilliaert: lawyer for the Buoniol family.
 
Dermot Dwyer: Retired former chief superintendent of the West Cork division of An Garda Siochana, former lead detective in the investigation.  
 
Eugene Gilligan: scenes of crimes officer.  
 
Jim Fitzgerald: detective on the investigation, in charge of two principle witnesses - Marie Farrell and Martin Graham.
 
James Donovan: retired head of Garda forensics lab in Dublin.  
 
Frank Buttimer: Ian Bailey's lawyer
 
Dominique Tricaud: Bailey's lawyer in France. 
 
James Hamilton: retired Director of Public Prosecutions. 
 
Billy O’Sullivan:  former owner of O’Sullivan's Pub in Crookhaven, County Cork. Sophie stopped at O’Sullivan's on the afternoon before she died.  
 
Shirley Foster: discovered the body shortly after 10am 23 December. 
 
Leo and Sally Bolger: West Cork couple who kept horses on land next to Sophie's house. Bolger claims he saw Alfie Lyons introduce Bailey to Sophie in 1995.

Episodes

References

External links
Official website - West Cork Podcast

Crime podcasts
County Cork
Works about murder
1996 in Ireland
Violence against women in Ireland